Milton Wright (November 17, 1828 – April 3, 1917) was the father of aviation pioneers Wilbur and Orville Wright, and a bishop of the Church of the United Brethren in Christ.

Family 
Milton Wright was the son of Dan Wright and Catherine Wright (Reeder), daughter of George Reeder and Margaret Van Cleve. Margaret Van Cleve was one of the earliest women of European ancestry to settle in the Miami River basin.

Milton met his future wife, Susan Catharine Koerner, b. 1831, d. 4 July 1889, at Hartsville College in 1853, where he was appointed as supervisor of the preparatory department and she was a literature student. After a long courtship, Milton asked Susan to marry him and accompany him on his assignment by the church to Oregon. She declined, but agreed to marry him when he returned. They married in 1859 when he was almost 31 and she was 28.

Both shared a love of learning for the sake of learning. Their home had two libraries — the first consisted of books on theology, the second was a large, varied collection. Looking back on his childhood, Orville once commented that he and his brother had
"special advantages...we were lucky enough to grow up in a home environment where there was always much encouragement to children to pursue intellectual interests; to investigate whatever aroused their curiosity."

Children 
Susan and Milton had seven children. Four sons and one daughter survived past infancy. Their first son, Reuchlin, was born in a log cabin in 1861 near Fairmount, Indiana. The second son, Lorin, was born in 1862 in Orange Township, Fayette County, Indiana. Wilbur was born 16 April 1867 near Millville, Indiana. The fourth and fifth children, twins Otis and Ida, were born 25 February 1870 at Dayton, Ohio, but died shortly thereafter, on 9 March and 14 March respectively, but were followed by the Dayton births of Orville on 19 August 1871, and the only surviving daughter Katherine on 19 August 1874.

None of the Wright children had middle names. Instead, their father tried hard to give them distinctive first names. Wilbur was named for Wilbur Fisk and Orville for Orville Dewey, both clergymen that Milton Wright admired. They were "Will" and "Orv" to their friends, and "Ullam" and "Bubs" to each other. In Dayton, their neighbors knew them simply as the "Bishop's kids."

Because of Milton's position in the church, the Wrights moved frequently — twelve times before finally returning permanently to Dayton in 1884.

Church service 
Milton joined the Church of the United Brethren in Christ in 1846 because of its stand on political and moral issues including alcohol, the abolition of slavery, and opposition to "secret societies" such as Freemasonry.

Indiana and Oregon
From 1855 to 1856, he served as an itinerant minister of the Church of the United Brethren in Indianapolis. He was ordained in 1856 and was pastor in Andersonville, Indiana, from 1856 to 1857. Later that year, he went to Oregon as a missionary and served as pastor at Sublimity and first president of Sublimity College, a denominational institution.

Wright returned from Sublimity in 1859 and was assigned by the church as a circuit preacher in eastern Indiana, where he also served as presiding elder and pastor in Hartsville, Indiana. From 1868 to 1869, he was professor of theology at Hartsville College.

Ohio and Iowa
In 1869, Milton became editor of the national weekly church newspaper, the Religious Telescope, and moved to the newspaper's headquarters of Dayton, Ohio; with this new position, his income increased from $900 per year to $1500 per year. The position gave him prominence within the church and helped him get elected as a bishop in 1877.

In 1871, he founded United Theological Seminary in Dayton.

Bishop Wright continued to advance in the church hierarchy. In 1878, he assumed responsibility for the Western conferences of the church and moved his family to Cedar Rapids, Iowa. Westfield College in Illinois, gave him the degree of D.D. in 1878.

He traveled widely on church business, but always sent back many letters and often brought presents home. His gifts stimulated his children's curiosity and exposed them to a world beyond their immediate surroundings. Returning from one of his travels, he brought Wilbur and Orville a toy helicopter. The helicopter was made of bamboo, cork, paper and powered by rubber bands. When the first broke, the boys made several copies. The toy helicopter is responsible for triggering the Wright brothers interest in aviation.

Division in the church
By 1881, the leadership of the Church of the United Brethren in Christ was becoming more liberal. Milton Wright, a staunch conservative, failed to be re-elected to his Bishop's post. The Wrights moved to Richmond, Indiana, where Milton served a circuit preacher once again. He served as presiding elder in the White River conference from 1881 to 1885. He also founded a monthly religious newspaper, The Star, for fellow conservatives in 1883.

As the liberals in his church began to press for change, Milton Wright sensed there would be a showdown with the conservatives. Wanting to get back into the fray, he decided to move back to Dayton, the political center of the Church of the United Brethren in Christ, in 1884. It was the last time he would move his family. Wright was once more elected bishop in 1885. He was to spend the next four years serving the Pacific Coast district.

The anticipated showdown came in 1889.  The church leadership wanted to give local conferences proportional representation at the General Conference, allow laymen to serve as delegates to General Conference, and allow United Brethren members to hold membership in secret societies.  The procedure for amending the Constitution made amendments all but impossible, but the leadership made the changes anyway, saying they were necessary for the good of the church.

However, a minority refused to accept the changes, claiming they weren't valid since they weren't approved by the full membership.  Wright was the only bishop to side with the minority. Wright and about 10,000 to 15,000 supporters left the meeting and reconvened at a new location. Contending that those supporting the changes had effectively seceded from the denomination, they declared themselves to be the true United Brethren Church. To distinguish themselves from the majority faction, the minority called itself the Church of the United Brethren in Christ (Old Constitution).

Wright became the new church's first bishop. Since they were in the minority, they had to rebuild from scratch; nearly all of the congregations who sided with the minority lost their property. Wright's sons Wilbur and Orville provided publishing services for the new organization until a publishing house could be established in Huntington, Indiana. Wright also provided valuable support to Huntington College (now Huntington University), established by the Old Constitution branch in 1897.

Keiter controversy
At the turn of the century, Wright was adamant about prosecuting the publishing house agent, Millard Keiter, who was accused of embezzling. Many members of the publishing board supported Keiter. Because of the controversy, Wright's home district, the White River Conference, voted to rescind his license as minister. The General Conference overruled the home conference in 1905, reinstating Wright. Keiter moved to Kentucky, where he was indicted for land fraud.

Retirement
Milton Wright retired in 1905.  He died in 1917.

See also
List of bishops of the United Methodist Church

References

External links

 Huntington College Magazine
 NASA Reliving the Wright Way
 Smithsonian National Air and Space Museum The Wright Brothers
 US Centennial of Flight Commission — Wright Family

1828 births
1917 deaths
American Methodist missionaries
American newspaper editors
American people of Dutch descent
American people of English descent
American religion academics
American United Brethren in Christ
Bishops of the Church of the United Brethren in Christ
Methodist missionaries in the United States
Editors of Christian publications
Evangelical United Brethren missionaries
People from Bartholomew County, Indiana
People from Dayton, Ohio
United Brethren in Christ clergy
Wright brothers
Burials at Woodland Cemetery and Arboretum
Bishops in Ohio
Wright family